The II Corps of the Grande Armée was a French military unit that existed during the Napoleonic Wars.

Campaigns
At its formation in 1805, General Auguste de Marmont was appointed commander of the II Corps.

Batavian Division, commanding officer Général de Division Count Jean-Baptiste Dumonceau

 1st Batavian Dragoon Regiment (2 Squadrons) 
 1st Batavian Hussar Regiment (2 Squadrons) 
 1st & 2nd Battalions, 1st Batavian Regiment 
 1st & 2nd Battalions, 2nd Batavian Regiment 
 1st & 2nd Battalions, 6th Batavian Regiment 
 1st & 2nd Battalions, Waldeck Regiment 
 1st Battalion, 1st Batavian Light Regiment 
 2nd Battalion, 2nd Batavian Light Regiment 
 1st Foot Artillery

War of the Third Coalition
The corps participated in the Ulm campaign before advancing southeast to serve as a flank guard. Still under Marmont, the troops then served as the garrison of the Illyrian Provinces until 1809 when they became the Army of Dalmatia and later XI Corps.

War of the Fifth Coalition
Meanwhile, a parallel II Corps was created in 1809 to fight against Austria. The formation was led first by Marshal Nicolas Oudinot, then by Marshal Jean Lannes who was fatally wounded at Aspern-Essling. Oudinot then took over II Corps again and won his marshal's baton at Wagram in July 1809.

Order of battle, 1809

Russian campaign
Still commanded by Oudinot, the corps took part in the invasion of Russia in 1812, at which point its size was roughly 40,000 men.

6th Division (Legrand)
 Joseph Jean-Baptiste Albert Brigade
 26th Light Infantry Regiment (4 battalions)
 Moreau Brigade
 56th Line Infantry Regiment (4 battalions)
 Nicolas Joseph Maison Brigade
 19th Line Infantry Regiment (4 battalions)
 Pamplona Brigade
 128th Line Infantry Regiment (2 battalions)
 3rd Portuguese Regiment (2 battalions)

8th Division Jean-Antoine Verdier
 Raymond-Vivies Brigade
 11th Light Infantry Regiment (4 battalions)
 2nd Line Infantry Regiment (5 battalions)
 Pouget Brigade
 37th Line Infantry Regiment (4 battalions)
 124th Line Infantry Regiment (3 battalions)

9th Division (Swiss) Pierre Hugues Victoire Merle
 François Pierre Joseph Amey Brigade
 4th Swiss Regiment (3 battalions)
 3rd Provisional Croatian Regiment (2 battalions)
 Condras Brigade
 1st Swiss Regiment (2 battalions)
 2nd Swiss Regiment (3 battalions)
 Coustard Brigade
 3rd Swiss Regiment (3 battalions)
 123rd Line Infantry Regiment (4 battalions)

Corps Cavalry
 Bertrand Pierre Castex Brigade
 23rd Chasseurs-à-Cheval Regiment (4 squadrons)
 24th Chasseurs-à-Cheval Regiment (4 squadrons)
 Jean-Baptiste Juvénal Corbineau Brigade
 7th Chasseurs-à-Cheval Regiment (4 squadrons)
 20th Chasseurs-à-Cheval Regiment (4 squadrons)
 8th Chevau-Légers-Lanciers (4 squadrons)

Sources: Les effectifs de la Grande-armée pour la campagne de Russe de 1812 - Paris 1913 Adjutant's Call of the Military Historical Society Vol. III - U.S.A.

War of the Sixth Coalition
The II Corps was reorganized in Germany in 1813, with Marshal Claude Victor-Perrin appointed to lead it.

War of The Seventh Coalition
The corps was headed by General Honoré Charles Reille in 1815 and took part in the Battle of Waterloo.

References

GAI02